Meteugoa is a genus of moths in the family Erebidae erected by George Hampson in 1900.

Species
 Meteugoa fasciosa Rothschild & Jordan, 1901
 Meteugoa melanoleuca Hampson, 1901
 Meteugoa obliquiata Hampson, 1900
 Meteugoa ochrivena Hampson, 1898
 Meteugoa venochrea van Eecke, 1920

References

External links

Lithosiini
Moth genera